Little Jungle Boy is a 1970 Australian television film

Plot
Doctors at a research centre in South East Asia discover a boy who appears to have grown up wild in the jungle. The boy faces hostility from people who want to kidnap him and a treacherous witchdoctor. Eventually the boy returns to the jungle.

Cast
Rahman Rahmin as Momman
Mike Dorsey as Doctor Mike Martin
Niki Huen as Doctor Niki Sung
Michael Pate as the Sultan
Noel Ferrier as Father John
Willie Fennell as Dr Barney O'Hara
Les Berryman

Production
The film was financed by an American company seeking product for the US TV market and Artransa Film Studios. Shooting took place short after their first Australian film. Strange Holiday (1970), partly on location in Singapore and Malaysia, as well as Artransa Studios in Sydney.

Reception
The movie returned a comfortable profit to its investors.

References

External links

Little Jungle Boy at Oz Movies

1970 television films
1970 films
Australian television films
Fictional feral children
1970s English-language films
1970s Australian films